Jake Ellis is an American politician and former firefighter from Idaho. Ellis was a Democratic member of Idaho House of Representatives for District 15, seat B.

Early life 
Ellis was born in Pocatello, Idaho. Ellis is a 4th-generation Idahoan.

Education 
In 1998, Ellis earned  Bachelor of Arts degree in Communications from Boise State University. Ellis attended the Executive Fire Officer Program at National Fire Academy. Ellis also attended Idaho State University.

Career 
In 1988, Ellis became a fireman with Boise Fire Department in Idaho, until 2014. Ellis retired as a Battalion Chief.

Elections

2020 
Ellis was unopposed in the Democratic primary. Ellis was defeated by Republican challenger Codi Galloway taking only 47.4% of the vote in the general election.

2018 
Ellis was unopposed in the Democratic primary. Ellis defeated Republican incumbent Patrick McDonald with 50.9% of the vote in the general election.

2016 
Ellis was unopposed in the Democratic primary. Ellis was defeated by Republican incumbent Patrick McDonald taking only 43.8% of the vote in the general election.

Awards 
 1992 Firefighter of the Year. Presented by City of Boise.

Personal life 
Ellis's wife is Amy Ellis. They have two children. Ellis and his family live in Pocatello, Idaho.

References

External links 
 Jake Ellis at ballotpedia.org

Living people
Democratic Party members of the Idaho House of Representatives
Year of birth missing (living people)
21st-century American politicians